Two-time defending champion Justine Henin defeated Ana Ivanovic in the final, 6–1, 6–2 to win the women's singles tennis title at the 2007 French Open. It was her fourth French Open title. For the second consecutive year, Henin won the title without losing a set or facing a tiebreak in any set during the tournament. Ivanovic became the first player representing Serbia to reach a major final.

The tournament saw the major debut of two future world No. 1s and major champions, Caroline Wozniacki and Angelique Kerber. Both lost in the first round, to Nathalie Dechy and Elena Dementieva, respectively. This was also the major debut of future WTA Finals champion Dominika Cibulková, who reached the third round as a qualifier before losing to Svetlana Kuznetsova.

Seeds

Qualifying

Draw

Finals

Top half

Section 1

Section 2

Section 3

Section 4

Bottom half

Section 5

Section 6

Section 7

Section 8

Championship match statistics

Notes

External links
Draw
2007 French Open – Women's draws and results at the International Tennis Federation

Women's Singles
French Open by year – Women's singles
French Open - Women's Singles
French Open – singles
French Open – singles